

ESPN on ABC
Note: Only includes ESPN announcers who have called at least two ABC games during one season.

Current

2022 Pairings
Chris Fowler or Rece Davis/Kirk Herbstreit/Holly Rowe
Sean McDonough/Todd Blackledge/Molly McGrath
Joe Tessitore/Greg McElroy/Katie George
Dave Pasch/Dusty Dvoracek/Tom Luginbill
Mark Jones/Robert Griffin III/Quint Kessenich
Bob Wischusen or Dave Flemming/Dan Orlovsky or Roddy Jones/Kris Budden

Play-by-play
Matt Barrie (2020–present)
Brian Custer (2022–present)
Dave Flemming (2013–present)
Chris Fowler (2014–present)
Mark Jones (2006–present)
Sean McDonough (2008–2015, 2018–present)
Beth Mowins (2010–2018, 2020–present)
Dave Pasch (2009–present)
Joe Tessitore (2008, 2011–2012, 2016–2017, 2020–present)
Bob Wischusen (2007–present)

Game Analysts
Todd Blackledge (2008–present)
Dusty Dvoracek (2017–present)
Dustin Fox (2022–present)
Rod Gilmore (2008–present)
Robert Griffin III (2021–present)
Kirk Herbstreit (2006–present)
Tom Luginbill (2013–present)
Greg McElroy (2016–present)
Kirk Morrison (2020–present)
Dan Orlovsky (2017–present)

Sideline Reporters
Tiffany Blackmon (2022–present)
Kris Budden (2015–present)
Taylor McGregor (2019–present)
Paul Carcaterra (2014–present)
Katie George (2020–present)
Quint Kessenich (2007–present)
Molly McGrath (2017–present)
Holly Rowe (2006–present)
Lauren Sisler (2019–present)

Studio Hosts
Kevin Negandhi (2017–present)

Studio Analysts
Booger McFarland (2017, 2020–present)

Former

Play-by-play
Adam Amin (2015–2019)
Allen Bestwick (2016)
Carter Blackburn (2010–2011)
Jason Benetti (2017–2022)
Eric Collins (2006, 2008)
Dan Fouts (2006–2007)
Ron Franklin (2007–2010)
Terry Gannon (2007–2009)
Dave LaMont (2006–2018)
Steve Levy (2016–2019)
Brent Musburger (2006–2016)
Mark Neely (2010–2018)
Brad Nessler (2006–2015)
Mike Patrick (2006–2017)
Gary Thorne (2006–2007)

Game Analysts
Anthony Becht (2016–2018)
Mike Bellotti (2010, 2015–2016)
Ray Bentley (2006–2018)
Rocky Boiman (2015–2018)
Tim Brant (2006–2007)
Ed Cunningham (2007–2016)
Bill Curry (2007)
Bob Davie (2006, 2008, 2011)
David Diaz-Infante (2009, 2013)
Mike Golic (2020)
Mike Golic Jr. (2020–2021)
Bob Griese (2006–2010)
Brian Griese (2009–2010, 2013–2019)
Danny Kanell (2011–2012, 2015)
James Hasty (2007)
Brock Huard (2008–2011, 2015–2018)
Craig James (2009–2011)
Paul Maguire (2006–2008)
Todd McShay (2014–2021)
Urban Meyer (2011)
Matt Millen (2009–2014)
David Norrie (2006–2009)
Jesse Palmer (2007, 2012–2016)
J. C. Pearson (2010–2011)
Chris Spielman (2007–2015)
Kelly Stouffer (2012, 2015)
Tommy Tuberville (2017)
Andre Ware (2006)

Sideline Reporters
Erin Andrews (2006–2011)
Jack Arute (2006–2008)
Bonnie Bernstein (2006–2007)
Alex Chappell (2016–2018)
Heather Cox (2008–2015)
Stacey Dales (2006, 2008)
Dawn Davenport (2015)
Olivia Dekker (2015, 2019)
Jeannine Edwards (2007–2014)
Todd Harris (2006–2008)
Dave LaMont (2006)
Jessica Mendoza (2008, 2014)
Samantha Ponder (2011, 2016)
Jerry Punch (2015–2016)
Tom Rinaldi (2014–2020)
Laura Rutledge (2014–2015, 2018)
Lisa Salters (2006–2011)
Joe Schad (2007)
Marty Smith (2015–2016)
Shelley Smith (2009–2013)
Shannon Spake (2013, 2015)
Maria Taylor (2012–2013, 2014–2015 (with SEC Network), 2017–2020)
Vince Welch (2007)
Allison Williams (2015–2020)

Studio Hosts
John Saunders (2006–2015)
Matt Winer (2006–2009)
Robert Flores (2009–2014)
Cassidy Hubbarth (2015–2019)
Stan Verrett (2016)

Studio Analysts
Craig James (2006–2008)
Doug Flutie (2006–2008)
Jesse Palmer (2009–2013)
Mack Brown (2014–2018)
Danny Kanell (2014)
Mark May (2015–2016)
Jonathan Vilma (2018–2019)
Mark Sanchez (2019–2020)

ABC Sports

Note: From 1978 through 1983, ABC broadcast Division I-AA games on select weekends with local sportscasting crews – those are not reflected in this list

Play-by-play

Mel Allen (1960–1961)
Steve Alvarez (1989)
Red Barber (1966)
Gary Bender (1982, 1987–1991)
Larry Birletti (1966, 1968)
Bud Campbell (1968–1970)
Rich Cellini (2001)
Eric Collins (2002–2003)
Dave Diles (1972)
Dan Dierdorf (1992–1993)
Jack Drees (1954)
Bill Flemming (1960, 1966–1983)
Bob Gallagher (1966)
Terry Gannon (1993–2005)
Gary Gerould (1995, 2004)
Frank Gifford (1991)
Curt Gowdy (1960–1961, 1982–1983)
Steve Grad (1981–1983)
Sean Grande (2000–2001)
Merle Harmon (1968–1970, 1973)
Jim Healy (1966)
Derrin Horton (2002)
Keith Jackson (1966–1969, 1971–2006)
Charlie Jones (1999–2001)
Mark Jones (1991–1999)
Dave LaMont (2005)
Jim Lampley (1974–1980)
Chris Lincoln (1976–1981)
Dan Lovett (1975)
Verne Lundquist (1974–1981)
Sal Marchiano (1974)
Dave Martin (1967)
Sean McDonough (2000–2003)
Jim McIntyre (1966)
Jim McKay (1967)
Corey McPherrin (1984, 1986)
Joel Meyers (1996)
Al Michaels (1977–1985, 1988, 1991–1992)
Bob Murphy (1971–1980)
Brent Musburger (1990–2005)
Stu Nahan (1975)
Brad Nessler (1997–2005)
Bill O'Donnell (1969)
Paul Page (2005)
Greg Papa (1996)
Ron Pinkney (1976–1977)
Jerry Punch (2003–2005)
Jack Rainbolt (1966)
Lynn Sanner (1968–1974)
Chris Schenkel (1966–1978, 1988)
Tom Schoendienst (1970)
Lon Simmons (1966)
Jim Simpson (1961)
Chip Tarkenton (2000)
Gary Thorne (2003–2005)
Mike Tirico (1999–2005)
Al Trautwig (1985)
Roger Twibell (1992–1999)
George Walsh (1950)
Rich Waltz (1998–1999)
Steve Zabriskie (1976–1982, 1991–1997)

Game Analysts

Mike Adamle (1986–1989)
Bob Anderson (1969)
Jamal Anderson (2004–2005)
Ray Bentley (2003–2005)
Dean Blevins (1993–1999)
Todd Blackledge (1994–1998)
Terry Bowden (2004–2005)
Tim Brant (1982–1987, 1991–2005)
Terry Brennan (1966–1967)
Frank Broyles (1977–1985)
Ron Burton (1969)
Harry Carson (1994)
Paul Christman (1960–1961)
Ed Cunningham (2000–2005)
Fran Curci (1982–1984)
Gary Danielson (1997–2005)
Duffy Daugherty (1973–1976)
Steve Davis (1976–1981)
Dan Dierdorf (1992–1993)
John Dockery (1978–1980)
Forest Evashevski (1970–1974)
Doug Flutie (1997)
Rick Forzano (1976–1983)
Dan Fouts (1997–1999, 2002–2005)
Russ Francis (1981)
Irving Fryar (2002)
Tom Gatewood (1981–1983)
Rod Gilmore (1998)
Bob Golic (1999)
Mike Golic (1997, 1999, 2003–2004)
Rosey Grier (1968)
Bob Griese (1987–2005)
Lee Grosscup (1967–1986)
Ralph Guglielmi (1968)
Tom Harmon (1954)
Mark Herrmann (2000–2001)
Brian Holloway (1995–1996)
Stan Humphries (1998)
Jackie Jensen (1966–1969)
Ron Johnson (1977)
Joe Kapp (1972)
Nick Lowery (1999)
Johnny Lujack (1968)
Ben Martin (1978–1981)
Mike Mayock (2001–2003)
Jack Mildren (1976)
David M. Nelson (1968–1973)
David Norrie (2000–2003)
Jim Owens (1975)
Ara Parseghian (1975–1981)
Clarence Peaks (1972)
Don Perkins (1975–1976)
Ron Pitts (1993)
Tom Ramsey (2005)
Gary Reasons (1995–1996)
Dan Reeves (2004)
Reggie Rivers (2000–2001)
Pepper Rodgers (1980–1981)
Darrell Royal (1980–1981)
Bo Schembechler (1992–1993)
John Spagnola (1991–1998)
Monty Stickles (1973–1974)
Lynn Swann (1983–2005)
Spencer Tillman (1998)
Dick Vermeil (1988–1996)
Everson Walls (1994)
Paul Warfield (1979–1980)
Bud Wilkinson (1966–1977)
John Yovicsin (1971)

Sideline Reporters
Steve Alvarez (1987–1989)
Jack Arute (1984–2005)
Becky Dixon (1986–1988)
Leslie Gudel (2000–2001)
Jim Gray (2004)
Todd Harris (1999–2005)
Lewis Johnson (1995–1997)
Mark Jones (1990)
Trenni Kusnierek (2005)
Dave LaMont (2004–2005)
Cheryl Miller (1989–1991)
Julie Moran (1993)
Mark Morgan (2004–2005)
John Naber (1993)
Jerry Punch (2004)
Sam Ryan (2002–2005)
Anne Simon (1982)
Suzy Shuster (2004–2005)
Chip Tarkenton (1995, 1999)
Al Trautwig (1985–1986)
Scott Walker (2005)
Vince Welch (2004–2005)

Studio Hosts
Bud Palmer (1966–1971)
Merle Harmon (1969–1972)
Dave Diles (1972–1981)
Warner Wolf (1975–1976)
Andrea Kirby (1977–1978)
Chris Schenkel (1979–1980)
Jack Whitaker (1982–1984)
Jim Lampley (1981–1987)
 Jim Hill (1987)
Al Trautwig (1988)
Roger Twibell (1989–1991)
John Saunders (1992–2005)

Studio Analysts
Beano Cook (1982–1985)
Bo Schembechler (1991)
Todd Blackledge (1996–1998)
Terry Bowden (1999–2003)
Craig James (2003–2005)
Aaron Taylor (2004–2005)

References

College Football personalities
ABC College Football personalities